The 1930 season of Auckland Rugby League was its 22nd. It was generally regarded that the season was very disappointing in terms of the quality of the football played and much of the blame was put down to the fact that too many teams were in the Senior A Grade and there was too much talent spread through the Senior B teams which in turn diluted the top division. There had been a noticeable drop in the attendances at matches at Carlaw Park which had seen 8 to 10 thousand regularly attending club matches. A review of the season was published in The New Zealand Herald on 22 October discussing the issue.

The Senior A championship was won by Ponsonby United for the second consecutive year which was their fifth title overall. They were awarded the Monteith Shield. This was the last year that the Monteith Shield was played for as the man this trophy was named after suggested that the main championship trophy should be one named in honour of Mr. Edwin Vincent Fox who had died earlier that year. Ponsonby also won the Roope Rooster trophy for the sixth time after defeating Richmond Rovers by 15 points to 7 in the final. Ponsonby were however beaten by Devonport United in the final of the Stormont Shield 17–5. This was the first time Devonport had won the Stormont Shield. A week later on 11 October Ponsonby played the champions of the South Auckland competition who were Ngaruawahia in the first match of its kind. Ponsonby won 32 to 29.

The Senior B championship was won by Otahuhu who beat the 1929 champions Point Chevalier in the final by 3 points to 0. The Stallard Cup knockout competition for Senior B teams was won by Richmond who defeated Point Chevalier 21–11 in the final. Richmond were the first club to enter a B team (effectively a reserve grade team) in this grade, and for the Stallard Cup they were joined by a B team from Devonport.

Key events and news 
In a major scandal following the Stormont Shield match between Ponsonby United and Devonport, Frank Delgrosso, the Auckland and New Zealand representative who was captain of the Ponsonby team was suspended for three seasons. Delgrosso was charged with misconduct along with another Ponsonby player V. Goodwin. They were also barred from attending Carlaw Park in the future. He failed to make a teammate who had been ordered off to leave the field, threw mud at the referee, and abused him.

Mt Albert was a new addition to the B Grade competition by entering a team there for the first time. This was their first senior grade team. They had won the Second Grade competition the previous year and were essentially ‘promoting’ the team.

The Auckland Rugby League placed a tender for its “Auckland Rugby League Programme and Gazette” for the 1930 season.

Prior to the season opening games the Auckland Star ran a piece on the prospects of each A Grade team and the players it had acquired.

As the season progressed much talk was made about the standard of the Senior A Grade and its inability to field enough sides of quality. The decision was eventually made to reduce the number of A Grade sides to 6 and to do away with the Senior B competition altogether for the following season. Instead the league would encourage good quality players to move from those sides to clubs with A Grade teams. A special committee was formed to suggest a way forward. They decided to recommend that the six teams to make up the A Grade for the 1931 season should be Ponsonby, Marist, Devonport, Metropolitan (to include City and Newton), Western Suburbs or Richmond, and Eastern Suburbs (to include Ellerslie). There was much discussion of the matter by members of various clubs over which clubs should merge or who disagreed that their club should disappear. The matter was further discussed in a Management Committee meeting on 15 October but a decision was deferred for a week.

On 29 October it was decided by the Auckland Rugby League to officially reduce the number of teams in the Senior A Grade to 6. The clubs would be known as Ponsonby United, Devonport, Marist Old Boys, Western Suburbs (Richmond Rovers and Kingsland), Metropolitan (City and Newton), and Eastern Suburbs (Ellerslie and the surrounding district). This was not to be the only time that Auckland Rugby League went down the path of making teams, who were often unwilling, into mergers. It happened again decades later before reverting to the norm, and then again in the 1990s before once again reverting to the norm with standalone clubs. Clubs who were particularly against the proposal were City Rovers, Newton Rangers, Kingsland Athletic, and Richmond.

Papakura hosted its first ever rugby league match when Richmond 2nd Grade and Newmarket 2nd Grade played there at the end of the season. Richmond won 20–10.

Obituaries 
Edward Vincent Fox
On 24 February Mr. Edward Vincent Fox died. He was a member of the Devonport team before World War I and played inside five-eighths for Auckland against England. In 1913 he enlisted in the war efforts and fought in the front lines. He was shot in the leg and when he returned to Auckland was unable to play again. He was appointed to the executive of Auckland Rugby League and was a selector for the Auckland and New Zealand teams. He was buried at O’Neill's Point Cemetery on the North Shore, New Zealand.

Monteith Shield (first grade championship)

Monteith Shield standings 
{|
|-
|

Monteith Shield fixtures

Round 1 
 Marist Old Boys victory over Kingsland Athletic was contested by Kingsland over an unregistered player (Munro) playing in the match. The protest was upheld and Kingsland were awarded the match. Marist Old Boys appealed to the New Zealand League Council but the decision was upheld by that body also. In the Round 1 match Craddock Dufty was ordered from the field for allegedly disputing a referees decision on a possible forward pass which led to the tying City Rovers try near the end of the match.

Round 2

Round 3 
Governor General Lord Bledisloe attended the Carlaw Park matches and was photographed with Ben Davidson of City rovers before the kickoff. Frank Delgrosso left the field early in the match for Ponsonby with an injured knee. In the second half Goodwin, Riley and Thompson all left the field injured and were not able to be replaced owing to the non-replacement rule which applied to the second half of matches. Goodwin was treated in hospital for concussion.

Round 4 
In the match between Marist and City, Sweeney was ordered off for Marist and Mita Watene was ordered off for City. Frank Delgrosso against left the field after injuring his knee while playing for Ponsonby.

Round 5

Round 6 
Teb Brimble made his debut for Newton Rangers after switching from the Manukau rugby club and joining his brother Cyril who was in his second season for Newton. At the end of the season Cyril was granted a transfer to Canterbury where he would play rugby league representatively.

Round 7 
The match between Ponsonby and Kingsland was played at the Mangere Domain.

Round 8 
The Marist v Kingsland match finished with an unusual scoreline of 0-0. Although the score was perhaps somewhat misleading as Marist Old Boys played two men short for most of the game with Batchelor and Norm Campbell going off injured in the first half. One of the only other times that this had happened since the first round of matches in 1910 when North Shore drew 0–0 with Newton.

Round 9

Round 10 
For Marist, Phil Brady was sent off for punching an Ellerslie player early in the second half. Bert Laing after an absence of 3 years turned out for Devonport.

Round 11

Round 12 
The Round 12 matches due to be played on 9 August were all postponed after rain fell on the Saturday. This added to the rain which had fallen throughout the week leading up to the Saturday.

Round 13

Roope Rooster knockout competition 
Craddock Dufty, who had returned from the recent New Zealand tour to Australia refused to play in the fixture against the Auckland players citing an injured elbow. He did not produce a doctors certificate and as a result Auckland Rugby League suspended him and he was unable to play for Ellerslie in their first round match. Jim O'Brien was sent off after a "verbal altercation" with referee Vic Simpson. This was to be his last official competition match of his career, though he did play in the McManus benefit match weeks later at Otahuhu.

Round 1

Semi finals

Final

Stormont Shield 
City and Devonport were tied for second place in the Senior A competition and as Ponsonby won both the Senior A championship and the Roope Rooster it left City and Devonport to play off for the right to join them in the Stormont Shield match. Devonport defeated City by 1 point to earn the right to play Ponsonby. In the final Ponsonby had J. Moore ordered off but he refused to leave. The referee then left the field until Moore was persuaded to leave and the game could progress. Moore was later suspended by the league. It eventually turned out that the Auckland and New Zealand representative Frank Delgrosso who was captain at the time had failed to persuade Moore to leave the field and had also verbally abused the referee and thrown mud at him. Delgrosso was suspended by the league for three years but on appeal and with an apology and expression of regret at a March 1931 meeting his suspension was reduced.

Play in Match

Stormont Shield final

Provincial club championship 
A game between the champions of the Auckland and South Auckland competitions Ponsonby and Ngaruawahia. George Tittleton fractured his collarbone after being thrown heavily near the end of the match. He finished the game but was taken to Auckland Hospital straight after the match. L Stevens, the Ponsonby hooker received a head injury which required stitches.

Top try scorers and point scorers
Top try and point scorers for A Grade and Roope Rooster matches. L O'Leary of Devonport United top scored with 72 points followed by Frank Delgrosso with 59, and Mincham with 56. George Batchelor of Marist Old Boys was the top try scorer with 15, followed by S Riley and George Perry with 12 each.

Senior B grade competition

Senior B grade standings 
A Mangere and Mt Albert result is missing as it was not reported in any of the newspapers of the time.
{|
|-
|

Senior B grade fixtures 
Mt Albert entered a senior team for the first time in their club history which had begun in 1928.

The Round 8 game between Mangere and Richmond B was not played because a charity match between Ponsonby and Kingsland was being played on its ground.

Parnell were referred to as the “magpies” on account of their black and white uniforms by the Auckland Star after their Round 9 match.

The Round 9 match report in the Auckland Star incorrectly reported the score 15–6 in favour of Northcote, however they corrected it in their following week reports of the Senior B matches as being a 15–6 win to Mangere.

The round 13 matches were cancelled due to steady rain falling on the Saturday adding to significant rain that had fallen during the week, aside from the game at Mangere. The Northcote v Otahuhu match was postponed as Northcote had played their traditional fixture v Huntly on Northcote's home ground at Stafford Park.

Otahuhu beat Point Chevalier in the final by 3 points to 0 to win the Senior B championship.

Stallard Cup knockout competition 
Devonport entered a Senior B team in the Stallard Cup which had not played in the Senior B grade during the season. This team could loosely be considered the second ever ‘reserve’ grade team fielded following the Richmond clubs entry of Senior B teams in that grade for the 1929 and 1930 seasons.

Other club matches and lower grades

Lower grade competitions 
Second Grade: Devonport United, Mangere, Marist Old Boys, Mount Wellington, Otahuhu Rovers, Ponsonby United (won the knock out competition), Richmond
Fourth Grade: Akarana, Avondale, City Rovers, Devonport United, Glen Lynn, Kingsland Athletic, Mount Albert United, Papatoetoe, Point Chevalier, Ponsonby United, Richmond Rovers
Sixth Grade A: City Rovers, Devonport United, Ellerslie United, Glen Lynn, Kingsland Athletic, Marist Old Boys A, Marist Old Boys B, Newmarket, Newton Rangers, Northcote & Birkenhead Ramblers, Point Chevalier, Ponsonby United, Richmond Rovers
Sixth Grade B: Avondale, City Rovers, Devonport United, Ellerslie United, Glen Lynn, Marist Old Boys, Northcote & Birkenhead Ramblers, Otahuhu United, Point Chevalier, Richmond Rovers A, Richmond Rovers B (Richmond Rovers A also won the knockout competition)
Primary Schools: Avondale, Avondale Convent, Devonport, Ellerslie, Mangere, Mount Albert, Newmarket, Newton, Northcote, Onehunga, Otahuhu, Papatoetoe, Parnell, Richmond (Richmond won the championship by beating Akarana (Parnell) 11–8 in the final)

Third Open Grade standings
(Ponsonby won the championship undefeated, and won the knockout competition)
{|
|-
|

Third Intermediate Grade standings
Kingsland Athletic (Newmarket won the knockout competition)
{|
|-
|

Fifth Grade standings
Marist Old Boys (Marist won the knockout competition)

References

External links 
 Auckland Rugby League Official Site

Auckland Rugby League seasons
Auckland Rugby League